Chubeh Daraq (also Romanized as Chūpeh Daraq; also known as Qal‘eh-ye Chapdaraq, Chapandara, Chūbeh Daraq Bālā, Chūbeh Daraq-e Bālā, and Chūbeh Daraq-e ‘Olyā) is a village in Minjavan-e Gharbi Rural District, Minjavan District, Khoda Afarin County, East Azerbaijan Province, Iran. At the 2006 census, its population was 112, in 31 families.

References 

Populated places in Khoda Afarin County